Lake Cushman is an unincorporated community on the shores of Lake Cushman in Mason County, Washington, United States.  It is also known as Cushman, and is sometimes considered part of the town of Hoodsport.  It also features a small state park, Hoodsport Trail State Park.  The Lake Cushman community also features Dow Mountain. There are camping grounds on the lake called Mossyrock and Taidnapam.

Unincorporated communities in Washington (state)
Unincorporated communities in Mason County, Washington